Sergey Mitin may refer to:
Sergey Anatolyevich Mitin (b. 1980), Russian footballer
Sergey Gerasimovich Mitin (b. 1951), Russian politician, governor of Novgorod Oblast